The 13th Pan American Games were held in Winnipeg, Manitoba, Canada from July 23 to August 8, 1999.

Medals

Gold

Mixed Hobie 16: Enrique Figueroa and Carla Malatrassi

Silver

Men's Épée Individual: Jonathan Peña

Men's Lightweight (– 73 kg): Carlos Méndez
Women's Lightweight (– 57 kg): Roxanna García

Bronze

Men's Team Competition: National Team
Luis Allende, Ricardo Dalmau, Sharif Fajardo, Arnaldo Febres, Rolando Hourruitiner, Antonio Latimer, Fernando Ortíz, Edgar Padilla, Daniel Santiago, Eddin Santiago, Carmelo Travieso, and Orlando Vega

Men's Light Flyweight (– 48 kg): Iván Calderón

Men's Rings: Diego Lizardi
Men's Pommel Horse: Luis Vargas

Men's Singles: Rod de Jesús

Women's Middleweight (– 67 kg): Ineabelle Díaz
Women's Heavyweight (+ 67 kg): Luz Medina

Men's Heavyweight (– 105 kg): Edries González

Men's Freestyle (– 76 kg): Manuel García

Results by event

Basketball

Men's Team Competition
Team Roster
Luis Allende
Ricardo Dalmau
Sharif Fajardo
Arnaldo Febres
Rolando Hourruitiner
Antonio Latimer
Fernando Ortíz
Edgar Padilla
Daniel Santiago
Eddin Santiago
Carmelo Travieso
Orlando Vega

See also
Puerto Rico at the 2000 Summer Olympics

References
 puertorico-herald
 

Nations at the 1999 Pan American Games
P
1999